A lesbian is a homosexual woman or girl.

Lesbian may also refer to:

 An inhabitant of Lesbos, a Greek island in the Aegean Sea.
 Lesbian Greek dialect, an Aeolic Greek dialect
 Lesbian rule, a flexible mason's rule made of lead  
 Lesbian wine, wine from the island of Lesbos
 , a name given to three ships
 "Lesbian", a 2018 song by Metro Boomin from Not All Heroes Wear Capes

See also
 Lesbia (disambiguation)